Loren Percy Thompson (February 28, 1927 – October 18, 2015) was an American politician and resort owner.

Born in Chicago, Illinois, Thompson served in the United States Navy. He received his bachelor's degree in physics from St. Ambrose University in Davenport, Iowa. He also went to graduate school at Boston University. In 1976, Thompson bought Cedar Crest Resort on White Earth Lake in Maple Grove Township, Becker County, Minnesota. In 1991 and 1992, Thompson served in the Minnesota House of Representatives and was a Democrat. He was elected from Waubun, Minnesota. In 1996, Thompson and his wife Janie moved to Bull Shoals, Arkansas and he served as the mayor of Bull Shoals. In 2009, he moved to Detroit Lakes, Minnesota. Thompson died in Detroit Lakes, Minnesota.

Notes

1927 births
2015 deaths
Politicians from Chicago
People from Detroit Lakes, Minnesota
People from Mahnomen County, Minnesota
People from Marion County, Arkansas
Military personnel from Illinois
Businesspeople from Minnesota
Democratic Party members of the Minnesota House of Representatives
Mayors of places in Arkansas
20th-century American businesspeople